Streetcars and interurbans operated in the Maryland suburbs of Washington, D.C., between 1890 and 1962.  Lines in Maryland were established as separate legal entities, but eventually they were all owned or leased by DC Transit (see Streetcars in Washington, D.C.). Unlike the Virginia lines, the Washington and Maryland lines were scheduled as a single system.  Most of the streetcar lines were built  with grand plans in mind, but none succeeded financially. A combination of the rise of the automobile, various economic downturns and bustitution eventually spelled the end of streetcars in southern Maryland.

Companies

Rock Creek Railway
The Rock Creek Railway was one of the first electric streetcar companies in Washington, D.C. It was incorporated in 1888 and started operations in 1890. After expansion, the line ran from the Cardoza/Shaw neighborhood of D.C. to Chevy Chase Lake, Maryland. On September 21, 1895, Rock Creek Railway purchased the Washington and Georgetown Railroad Company and the two formed the Capital Traction Company.

Remnants of the Line include:
 The Chevy Chase Lake waiting station which existed at the northern end of the line was disassembled in 1980 and moved to Hyattstown, Maryland.

Tennallytown and Rockville Railroad
The Tennallytown (Tenleytown) and Rockville Railroad, which opened in 1890, was an extension of the Georgetown & Tennallytown Railway. It ran from the terminus of the Georgetown & Tennallytown at Western and Wisconsin Ave NW to Rockville via Wisconsin Avenue, Old Georgetown Road and its own right-of-way. It was acquired by the Washington and Rockville Electric Railway Company in 1897, and again by Washington Railway and Electric Company in 1902. In 1935, it converted to buses.

Tennallytown (Tenleytown)
Somerset
Bethesda
Alta Vista
Bethesda Park
Montrose
Halpine
Fairgrounds
Rockville

Remnants of the line include:
 Wisconsin Avenue and Old Georgetown Road still exist
 The North Bethesda Trail, a rail trail runs along the old right of way
 Woodglen Drive in Rockville

Glen Echo Railroad

Opened on June 10, 1891, and connected Glen Echo with the Tennallytown & Rockville Railroad in Friendship Heights.  In 1896 it was expanded to Cabin John and renamed the Washington & Glen Echo Railroad. Shortly thereafter, it was extended eastward from Willard Avenue to Chevy Chase Circle, where it connected with the Rock Creek Railway. It was abandoned in 1900, but the section from Glen Echo to Cabin John was incorporated into the Washington & Great Falls Electric Railway.

Railroad tracks and the trestle site remain visible in the Willard Avenue Neighborhood Park in Bethesda, Maryland

Washington & Great Falls Electric Railway
Incorporated in 1892 and opened in 1895, the Washington & Great Falls Electric Railway Company (WGFERC) began in Georgetown at the Georgetown Car Barn on 36th and Prospect Streets and ran in a private right-of-way along the lands of the Washington Aqueduct to Glen Echo and from there along the old tracks of the Glen Echo Railroad to Cabin John. Because the railroad never reached Great Falls, but instead terminated at Cabin John, it was often referred to as the "Cabin John Trolley". In 1902 the WGFERC‎ purchased the bankrupt Washington Traction and Electric Company (a holding company for 10 streetcar lines). The merged company was renamed as the Washington Railway & Electric Company (WREC). In 1933 WREC was acquired by the Capital Traction Company. The railway line to Cabin John was abandoned in 1960. The former roadbed is still discernible in The Palisades and in Montgomery County, Maryland.

Remnants of the line in Montgomery County  include:

 Trestle over Walhonding Brook, between MacArthur Boulevard and Clara Barton Parkway
 Trestle over Minnehaha Branch on northwest side of Glen Echo Park. After a 2006 land swap that gave this section of the right-of-way to the National Park Service, this trestle was rehabilitated in 2014 and the MacArthur Boulevard Bike Path was rerouted to pass over it. 
 Trestle over Braeburn Branch just west of Wellsley Circle
 Much of the right-of-way from Brookmont to Cabin John Parkway is extant.

City and Suburban Railway
The City and Suburban Railway was chartered in 1890 to run a streetcar from just east of the White House at New York Avenue and 15th St NW to what is now Mount Rainier on the D.C. line. On March 31, 1892 the Maryland and Washington Railway incorporated to build a rail line connecting any passenger railway in the District of Columbia to Branchville and eventually Laurel.

On April 4, 1896 The Maryland and Washington, having difficulty raising money, merged with several other struggling streetcar companies to create the Columbia and Maryland Railway.

Meanwhile, the City and Suburban was laying down track, reaching Mount Rainier in 1897. In 1898 it  merged with the Eckington & Soldiers Home Railroad. It continued building tracks, now into Maryland, reaching Brentwood in 1898; and Hyattsville and Riverdale in 1899. The company was also building a line south from Baltimore, making it as far as Ellicott City. The two lines never connected and the Baltimore line became Trolley Line Number 9.

The Columbia and Maryland renamed itself the Berwyn and Laurel Electric Railroad Company and started building tracks from the end of the City and Suburban in Riverdale to College Park and Laurel by 1902 - at which time it changed its name again, this time to the Washington, Berwyn and Laurel Electric Railroad Company.

Eventually, the City and Suburban took over control of the Washington, Berwyn and Laurel until it was itself absorbed by the Washington Railway and Electric Company. 
It had stops in the following cities.

Hyattsville
Riverdale
College Park
Lakeland
Berwyn
Branchville
Beltsville
Contee
Laurel

Remnants of the line include:

Stations
4701 Queensbury Road, Riverdale Park
531 Main Street, Laurel, now Oliver's Old Towne Tavern
Roads
Bus Turnaround north of the intersection of Rhode Island Avenue and 34th Street in Mount Rainier used to be a streetcar turnaround
Rail Trails
 College Park Trolley Trail

Washington, Woodside and Forest Glen Railway Power Company
The Washington, Woodside and Forest Glen Railway, aka the "Forest Glen Trolley", was incorporated on July 26, 1895, and built a 2.9 mile line that opened on November 25, 1897. A single ride cost five cents.  The streetcar ran from the terminus of the Brightwood Railway at Eastern Avenue and Georgia Avenue along the west side of Georgia Avenue and then along what is now Seminary Road to the National Park Seminary, a fashionable school for girls in Forest Glen, at Forest Glen Road.  This line faced competition from passenger service on the Metropolitan Branch of the Baltimore and Ohio Railroad.  The line was shut down on December 15, 1924 in preparation for construction of the first Georgia Avenue underpass under the B&O Railroad. The underpass was built with one lane for the trolley tracks, but the trolley never resumed operation.

Stations on the line were:

Silver Spring
Sligo
Woodside
Forest Glen

The Kensington Railway
The Kensington Railway was incorporated in 1894 as the Chevy Chase Lake & Kensington Railway. It began operation on May 30, 1895.  In 1902 it changed its name to the Kensington Railway. It was a single-track line beginning at the northern terminus of the old Rock Creek Railway at Chevy Chase Lake along Connecticut Avenue. It traveled north along what is now Kensington Parkway to a station on University Boulevard in Kensington. In 1902 the Montgomery Electric Light and Railway set out to extend the line as far as Ellicott City but it only made it as far as Norris Station in Kensington, which happened in 1916. In 1906 it was acquired by the Sandy Spring Railway and changed its name to that. From 1923 to 1933 the line was leased by Capital Traction, but early in the morning of September 15, 1935 the last car ran its route. When the line south of the Kensington was replaced with buses, the Kensington no longer had access to power and operations were suspended, but it never reopened.

The right of way was eventually converted into a road and the trestle over Rock Creek was dismantled.

Remnants of the line include:
Roads
Kensington Parkway, Kensington

The Baltimore and Washington Transit Company
The B&W Transit Company was incorporated on April 7, 1896. In 1897, it began construction on an electric street railway system, known locally as the Dinky Line, that began at 4th and Butternut Streets NW (then known as Umatilla St), traveled south on 4th to Aspen Street NW (then known as Tahoe Street) and then east on Aspen and Laurel Streets NW (then known as Spring Street) into Maryland.  It continued on Ethan Allen Avenue until it reached the hugely popular Wildwood Resort and Glen Sligo Hotel on Sligo Creek, which would be about midway between Elm Avenue and Sligo Creek Parkway, on what is Heather Avenue today.  In 1903, the Takoma Park city council took over the lease given by the B & W Transit Company and the resort was closed for illegal gambling. The tracks were removed some two years later and the right-of-way reverted to the town. In 1920, the hotel was torn down and the property subdivided into individual lots. In 1937, the tracks were completely dismantled.

The Washington, Spa Spring and Gretta Railroad Company

Began in 1910 as a single-track trolley line.  It ran from a car barn at 15th and H Street, NE in Washington along Bladensburg Road to Bladensburg. The line was initially planned to run as far as Gettysburg, Pennsylvania, but service was only extended as far as Berwyn Heights. (This happened in 1912 using battery cars.) The line became the Washington Interurban Railway in 1912 and the Washington Interurban Railroad Company in 1916. In 1923 the streetcars were replaced by buses and the tracks removed when Bladensburg Road was paved.

The Washington and Great Falls Railway and Power Company

Beginning on July 2, 1913, this single-track line began operating from a junction with the Tennallytown and Rockville Railroad at what is now Bradley Lane and Wisconsin Avenue and along Bradley Boulevard to River Road. From there, it ran on its own right of way to Great Falls. Service was discontinued on February 12, 1921 and the tracks were removed in 1926.

Remnants of the line include the Gold Mine Spur Trail in Chesapeake and Ohio National Historical Park, which utilizes about 1000 feet of the Washington and Great Falls rail bed and cut.

Interurbans
Washington, Baltimore and Annapolis Electric Railroad, 1908 – 1935

Trolley parks
 Glen Echo Park
 Great Falls Park
 Marshall Hall
 Chevy Chase Lake

See also
Washington Metro
Urban rail transit
Bustitution
Trolley park
National Capital Trolley Museum

References

External links
The Trolley Era in Rockville 1900–1935
Photo tour of the Washington & Laurel line
 Photo tour of the Catonsville & Ellicott City line
Info on W B & A Electric, Annapolis Short Line, and Baltimore & Annapolis Railroads
Kensington Trolley Line

Defunct Maryland railroads
Defunct public transport operators in the United States
Washington D.C.
Maryland